Tutton may refer to:

Tutton (surname)
Tutton Point in Antarctica 
Tutton's salts, a family of complex sulfate or selenate salts
R v Tutton, a decision by the Canadian Supreme Court